Adel Labib is the former governor of Alexandria,
and Beheira Governorate, and the current governor of Qena Governorate since 4 August 2011. He was appointed as the minister of local development in the interim government of Egypt. He was later removed as Minister of Local Development in 2015.

See also
 Timeline of Alexandria, 2000s

Notes

Living people
Year of birth missing (living people)
Local Development ministers of Egypt
Governors of Qena
Governors of Alexandria